Philippe Leduc (born 1951) (born in Montreal, Quebec, Canada) is a Quebecois composer, conductor, author and arranger.

Discography

Albums 
 Diginada (2010)
 The Wings of Fire, Volume II: Toil (1997)
 The Wings of Fire, Volume I: Blood (1995)
 Splendeur & Misère (Previously released as "Éclair de Lune") (1993)

Compilations
 Mes Grands Classiques (2009)

Books
 Les Ailes du Feu (1997, Éditions STANKE)

Children's Albums/books
 Chabicouin au Marais long (CD)
 Chabicouin à la ferme (CD)
 Chabicouin au Marais long (Livre-CD)
 Shubiquack (CD)

Concerts
 The Wings of Fire (Montreal, Canada)

Videos
 No Pasaràn
 Anastasia Élégie 
 The Wings of Fire, Volume II: Toil 
 The Wings of Fire, Volume I: Blood

Awards
 2005
SOCAN Award Movie and television music
Triple platinum (300,000 albums sold) Marie-Hélène Thibert, self-titled album, arrangements, orchestration, and production of the song "Le Ciel est à moi"
 2004
SOCAN Award Movie and television music
 2003
GEMINI Award Best Musical Theme, Television, "Zone Libre"
 2001
Grand Prize Concours Grafika, "Docs en Stock"
 1998
Harmony Award 42nd Competition for Films and Videos (Japan)
Silver Award New York Festival TV Programming and Television "Les Beaux Dimanches"
 1996
1996 ADISQ Awards
Prix Félix, Arranger of the Year "The Wings of Fire, Volume I: Blood"
 1995
1995 ADISQ Awards
Prix Félix - Instrumental Album of the Year "Éclair de Lune"
 1994
1994 SOCAN Award
Movie and television music

References

External links
 Official Philippe Leduc site
 
 Chabicouin
 Select digital: Philippe Leduc

Living people
Canadian composers
Canadian male composers
Male conductors (music)
Canadian music arrangers
Musicians from Montreal
Université de Montréal alumni
21st-century Canadian conductors (music)
21st-century Canadian male musicians
1951 births